Luise Heyer (born 25 March 1985) is a German actress.

Biography
Heyer grew up in Berlin. During her school years, she lived in Denmark for a year. From 2006 until 2010, she attended Rostock University of Music and Theatre in Mecklenburg, where she studied acting. In 2010, she joined the Dortmund Theatre, where she stayed for two years. She was voted best actress in the 2012 season at the Dortmund Theatre.

In 2011, she played her first leading role in the feature film Westwind, portraying the East German rower Isabel, whose twin sister falls in love with a West German man during a stay in Hungary. In 2014, she played Sanna in Edward Berger's film Jack, which was part of the 2014 Berlinale. In 2015, she acted in Rosa von Praunheim's film Tough Love.

Since 2017, Heyer has appeared in the Netflix original series Dark as Doris Tiedemann.

In 2019, Heyer was awarded the rare honor of a double nomination at the German Film Awards. She was noted both for the main role of a rape victim in The Most Beautiful Couple and for her supporting role in Der Junge muss an die frische Luft. For this, she received the 2019 German Film Award in the Best Female Supporting Role category. In the same year, she received the Bambi Award in the National Actress category for both roles.

Selected filmography

References

External links
 
 Luise Heyer at Fitz+Skoglund talent agency

1985 births
Living people
German film actresses
21st-century German actresses
Actresses from Berlin